Dyschirius larochellei is a species of ground beetle in the subfamily Scaritinae. It was described by Bousquet in 1988.

References

larochellei
Beetles described in 1988